Rhinehart is an unincorporated community in La Salle and Catahoula parishes, Louisiana, United States. Rhinehart has a post office with ZIP code 71363.

References

Unincorporated communities in LaSalle Parish, Louisiana
Unincorporated communities in Catahoula Parish, Louisiana
Unincorporated communities in Louisiana